Richard Wesson (February 20, 1919 – January 27, 1979) was an American movie and television announcer. He is best known as the announcer for The Wonderful World of Disney from 1954–1979, and many Quinn Martin series.

Personal life
Wesson was born in Boise, Idaho on February 20, 1919. He had three marriages, with three children by two of his wives. He committed suicide on January 27, 1979, aged 59.

Career
Wesson started in radio and worked as an announcer on early television shows, among them Space Patrol. On the live television special covering the opening of Disneyland, Wesson appeared as the captain of the Rocket to the Moon ride and was interviewed by Art Linkletter and Danny Thomas. He occasionally did some acting, including appearances in the Golden Horseshoe Revue show at Disneyland.

Wesson did the narration for many movie trailers, Disney and non-Disney as well as the opening announcements for such television series as Hawaiian Eye, The Fugitive, and The Invaders.

External links

1919 births
1979 deaths
Male actors from Idaho
People from Costa Mesa, California
Radio and television announcers
Suicides by firearm in California
People from Boise, Idaho
20th-century American male actors
Disney people
1979 suicides